Ruby Yayra Goka (born 15 May 1982, Accra) is a Ghanaian dentist and author. She has 15 books to her credit and is best known for being a multiple Burt Award for African Literature winner in Ghana.

Goka, who is an alumnus of the University of Ghana Dental School, currently heads the Dental Department of the Volta Regional Hospital, Ho.

Life 

Born in Accra, Ghana, Goka was born to Simon Yao Goka, a retired diplomat and Lydia Aku Goka, a stay-at-home-mother. When Ruby was two years old, her family moved to Ethiopia, where she attended the Peter Pan International School. When she was six, her family moved back to Ghana and she continued her basic and secondary education at the St. Anthony's School (1988–96) and Achimota School (1996–99) respectively both in Accra.

She obtained a BDS from the University of Ghana Dental School in 2009 and worked for two years at the Ridge Hospital Accra, in Accra. She later moved to Sogakofe, where she worked for two years at the South Tongu District Hospital. She became a member of the Ghana College of Physicians and Surgeons in 2016 after completing her residency training at the Komfo Anokye Teaching Hospital, Kumasi. She currently heads the Dental Department of the Volta Regional Hospital, Ho.

In 2017, Goka won an award in the Authorship and Creative Writing Category in the 40 under 40 awards in Ghana. She was also awarded a Medical Excellence Award in Dentistry in the same year. Goka is a 2017 Mandela Washington Fellow.

Bibliography 

Adult Books:

 Disfigured (2011)
 In The Middle of Nowhere (2011)  
 Rain Music (to be published in 2018)

Young Adult Books:

 The Mystery of The Haunted House (2010)
 The Lost Royal Treasure (2011)
 When the Shackles Fall (2012)
 Those Who Wait  (2012)
 Perfectly Imperfect (2013)
 Plain Yellow (2014)
 The Step-Monster (2015)
 To Kiss A Girl (to be published in 2018)

Children Books:

 A Gift for Fafa
 Tani’s Wish (2016)
 Mama’s Amazing Cover Cloth (to be published in 2018)
 My First Visit to the Dentist (Co-authored with Richard Selormey. To be published in 2018)

Anthologies:

 Mother, Anthology of writing on mothers (contribution: "The ABCs of motherhood")

Awards 

 Medical Excellence Award – Dentist category (2017)
 40 under 40 award – Authorship and creative writing (2017)
 Burt Award for African Young Adult Literature (2017) (Finalist)
 Ghana Writers’ Awards – Short Story Category (2017) (Finalist)         
 Burt Award for African Young Adult (2017) (Honour Prize)
 Burt Award for African Literature (2015) (First Prize)
 Burt Award for African Literature (2014) (Second Prize)
 Burt Award for African Literature (2013) (First Prize)
 Burt Award for African Literature (2012) (Second Prize)
 Burt Award for African Literature (2012) (Honourable Mention)
 Burt Award for African Literature (2011) (Second Prize)
 Burt Award for African Literature (2010) (Third Prize)

References 

1982 births
Living people
Ghanaian women writers
Ghanaian women poets
Academic staff of the University of Ghana
People from Accra